Franvillers is a commune in the Somme department in Hauts-de-France in northern France.

Geography

Population

Places of interest
 The war memorial

See also
Communes of the Somme department

References

External links

 Photos 

Communes of Somme (department)